Adriana Lecouvreur is a 1955 Italian biographical film about 18th-century actress Adrienne Lecouvreur. It stars actor Gabriele Ferzetti.

Cast
 Valentina Cortese: Adriana Lecouvreur
 Gabriele Ferzetti: Maurizio di Sassonia
 Olga Villi: Principessa di Bouillon
 Annibale Ninchi: Principe di Bouillon
 Memo Benassi: Michonnet
 Leonardo Cortese: Conte di Chazeul
 Valeria Valeri: La Duclos
 Monica Vitti
 Carlo Tamberlani
 Renato Malavasi
 Silvano Tranquilli
 Luciana Paluzzi
 Pietro Tordi

References

External links

Adriana Lecouvreur at Variety Distribution

1955 films
Italian biographical drama films
Italian historical films
1950s biographical drama films
1950s Italian-language films
Italian films based on plays
Films set in the 1720s
Films set in the 1730s
Cultural depictions of Adrienne Lecouvreur
Films based on works by Eugène Scribe
1955 drama films
Films scored by Renzo Rossellini
Italian black-and-white films
1950s Italian films